Fire Control Tower No. 23 is a NRHP-listed tower located in Lower Township, Cape May County, New Jersey, United States. The tower was built in 1942 as part of Fort Miles, the system of harbor defenses of the Delaware Bay.  It was one of 15 towers from North Wildwood, New Jersey to Bethany Beach, Delaware used to aim coastal batteries at German ships and submarines. It is located near Sunset Beach in Cape May Point State Park.

The tower was added to the New Jersey Register of Historic Places on May 29, 2003, and to the National Register of Historic Places on November 17, 2003.  About this time the tower was renovated under the direction of architect Robert Russell.  Spiral staircases, lighting and safety features were installed, allowing the public to climb to the top of the tower and a wooden walkway was built to Sunset Avenue.

See also
National Register of Historic Places listings in Cape May County, New Jersey
Battery 223
Fire Control Tower

References

Government buildings completed in 1942
Lower Township, New Jersey
Buildings and structures in Cape May County, New Jersey
Military facilities on the National Register of Historic Places in New Jersey
National Register of Historic Places in Cape May County, New Jersey
New Jersey Register of Historic Places
1942 establishments in New Jersey